1740 Broadway (formerly the MONY Building or Mutual of New York Building) is a 26-story building on the east side of Broadway, between 55th and 56th Streets, in the Midtown Manhattan neighborhood of New York City. The building is owned by EQ Office and shares a city block with the Park Central Hotel.

Mutual of New York built the structure in 1950 for its corporate headquarters and hired Shreve, Lamb and Harmon to design it. It left the building after being acquired by AXA. Mutual Insurance had been renamed MONY Life Insurance Company in 1998. The building was completely renovated in 2007.

Signage on the facade
Its most famous attribute was once a sign at the top of its facade which advertised for Mutual of New York, the structure's original owner. The first version spelled out the entire name, with the first letter of each of the words in it (MONY) being red neon lighting which was twice the size of the rest. It was in this form that the sign served as both the inspiration for Tommy James and the Shondells' 1968 hit single "Mony Mony" and as a motif in Midnight Cowboy. The subsequent version was the corporate logo, which was the insurance company's acronym with a dollar sign inside the "O."

The MONY sign was removed by Vornado in December 2007, and replaced with "1740" to reflect its street address.

The Weather Star
Perched on the roof is the Weather Star, a  tower of lights topped with a star-shaped weather beacon which was built by Artkraft Strauss. The star was green if the following day's weather forecast was fair; orange for cloudy; flashing orange for rain; and flashing white for snow. The direction the lights on the tower moved depended on whether the temperatures were expected to rise or fall; absence of movement meant no change. The Weather Star is still operable, but is no longer used for meteorological forecasting purposes. An electronic digital board with four sides that has always shown the time and temperature is located at the base of the tower.

Tenants
L Brands
Davis & Gilbert LLP

References

External links
1740broadway.com
Emporis profile

Skyscraper office buildings in Manhattan
Office buildings completed in 1950
Midtown Manhattan
Broadway (Manhattan)
1950 establishments in New York City
Leadership in Energy and Environmental Design basic silver certified buildings